Cruise ships are large passenger ships used mainly for vacationing. Unlike ocean liners, which are used for transport, cruise ships typically embark on round-trip voyages to various ports-of-call, where passengers may go on tours known as "shore excursions". On "cruises to nowhere" or "nowhere voyages", cruise ships make two- to three-night round trips without visiting any ports of call.

Modern cruise ships tend to have less hull strength, speed, and agility compared to ocean liners. However, they have added amenities to cater to water tourists, with recent vessels being described as "balcony-laden floating condominiums".

As of December 2018, there were 314 cruise ships operating worldwide, with a combined capacity of 537,000 passengers. Cruising has become a major part of the tourism industry, with an estimated market of $29.4 billion per year, and over 19 million passengers carried worldwide annually . The industry's rapid growth saw nine or more newly built ships catering to a North American clientele added every year since 2001, as well as others servicing European clientele until the COVID-19 pandemic in 2020 saw the entire industry all but shut down.

As of 2022, the world's largest passenger ship is Royal Caribbean's .

History

Origins

Italy, a traditional focus of the Grand Tour, offered an early cruise experience on the Francesco I, flying the flag of the Kingdom of the Two Sicilies. Built in 1831, the Francesco I sailed from Naples in early June 1833, preceded by an advertising campaign. Nobles, authorities, and royal princes from all over Europe boarded the cruise ship, which sailed in just over three months to Taormina, Catania, Syracuse, Malta, Corfu, Patras, Delphi, Zante, Athens, Smyrna and Constantinople, providing passengers with excursions and guided tours, dancing, card tables on the deck and parties on board. However, it was restricted to the aristocracy of Europe and was not a commercial endeavour.

P&O first introduced passenger-cruising services in 1844, advertising sea tours to destinations such as Gibraltar, Malta and Athens, sailing from Southampton. The forerunner of modern cruise holidays, these voyages were the first of their kind. P&O Cruises is the world's oldest cruise line. The company later introduced round trips to destinations such as Alexandria and Constantinople. It underwent a period of rapid expansion in the latter half of the 19th century, commissioning larger and more luxurious ships to serve the steadily expanding market. Notable ships of the era include the SS Ravenna built in 1880, which became the first ship built with a total steel superstructure, and the SS Valetta built in 1889, which was the first ship to use electric lights.

The cruise of the German ship  in the Mediterranean Sea and the Near East from 22 January to 22 March 1891, with 241 passengers (including Albert Ballin and his wife), popularized cruises to a wider market. Christian Wilhelm Allers published an illustrated account of it as Backschisch (Baksheesh).

The ship was completed in 1900.

The practice of luxury cruising made steady inroads into the more established market for transatlantic crossings. In the competition for passengers, ocean liners –  being the most famous example – added luxuries such as fine dining, luxury services, and staterooms with finer appointments. In the late-19th century, Albert Ballin, director of the Hamburg-America Line, was the first to send his transatlantic ships out on long southern cruises during the worst of the North Atlantic winter seasons. Other companies followed suit. Some of them built specialized ships designed for easy transformation between summer crossings and winter cruising.

In 1897 three luxury liners, all European-owned, offered transportation between Europe and North America. In 1906 the number had increased to seven. La Lorraine and La Savoie sailed for the French Compagnie Générale Transatlantique.

From luxury ocean liners to "megaship" cruising
With the advent of large passenger jet aircraft in the 1960s, intercontinental travelers switched from ships to planes, sending the ocean liner trade into a terminal decline. Certain characteristics of older ocean liners made them unsuitable for cruising duties, such as high fuel consumption, deep draught preventing them from entering shallow ports, and cabins (often windowless) designed to maximize passenger numbers rather than comfort. In the late 1950s and 1960s, ships such as Holland America Line's SS Rotterdam (1959), the French Line's SS France (1961), and Cunard Line's RMS  (1969) were designed to serve the dual purposes of ocean liner during the northern hemisphere summer months and cruise ship in the winter, incorporating doors and baffles that could be open or closed to divide classes or open the ship to one class, wherein all passengers received roughly the same quality berthing and most of the same facilities. (Passengers in cabins in certain grades on the Queen Elizabeth 2 had access only to certain dining rooms). 

Ocean liner services aimed at passengers ceased in 1986. The Rotterdam was put on permanent cruise service, as was the France, albeit modified and renamed Norway in 1980, as part of Norwegian Cruise Line. This made the Norway, by then the largest passenger vessel in the world, the first "mega-cruise ship". Cunard, on the other hand, put the Queen Elizabeth 2 on more cruises, but also, in an attempt to shift the focus of the market from passenger travel to cruising with entertainment value, pioneered the luxury transatlantic cruise service, catering to a niche market of those who appreciated the several days at sea. International celebrities were hired to perform acts onboard, along with cabarets, and with the addition of a casino and other entertainment amenities, the crossing was advertised as a vacation in itself.

The 1970s television series Love Boat helped to popularize the concept as a romantic opportunity for couples. Another ship to make this transition was SS Norway, originally the ocean liner SS France and later converted to cruising duties as the Caribbean Sea's first "super-ship".

The Sovereign-class ships were the first "megaships" to be built specifically for the mass cruising market. They also were the first series of cruise ships to include a multi-story lobby with a glass elevator and had a single deck devoted entirely to cabins with private balconies, instead of oceanview cabins. As the veranda suites were particularly lucrative for cruise lines, something which was lacking in older ocean liners, recent cruise ships have been designed to maximize such amenities and have been described as "balcony-laden floating condominiums".

Until 1975–1980, cruises offered shuffleboard, deck chairs, "drinks with umbrellas and little else for a few hundred passengers". After 1980, they offered increasing amenities. As of 2010, city-sized ships have dozens of amenities.

The only comparable ocean liner to be completed in recent years has been Cunard Line's  in 2004. Following the retirement of her running mate Queen Elizabeth 2 in November 2008, Queen Mary 2 is the only liner operating on transatlantic routes, though she also sees significant service on cruise routes.
 

Queen Mary 2 was for a time the largest passenger ship before being surpassed by Royal Caribbean International's  vessels in 2006. The Freedom-class ships were in turn overtaken by RCI's own  vessels which entered service in 2009 and 2010. A distinctive feature of the Oasis-class ships is the split, atrium structure, made possible by the hull's extraordinary width, with the 6-deck high Central Park and Boardwalk outdoor areas running down the middle of the ship and verandas on all decks.

In two short decades (1988–2009), the largest class cruise ships have grown a third longer, almost doubled their widths, doubled the total passengers (2,744 to 5,400), and tripled in volume (73,000 to 225,000 GT). Also, the "megaships" went from a single deck with verandas to all decks with verandas.

Cruise lines

Operators of cruise ships are known as cruise lines, which are companies that sell cruises to the public. Cruise lines have a dual character; they are partly in the transportation business, and partly in the leisure entertainment business, a duality that carries down into the ships themselves, which have both a crew headed by the ship's captain, and a hospitality staff headed by the equivalent of a hotel manager. Among cruise lines, some are direct descendants of the traditional passenger shipping lines (such as Cunard), while others were founded from the 1960s specifically for cruising.

Historically, the cruise ship business has been volatile. The ships are large capital investments with high operating costs. A persistent decrease in bookings can put a company in financial jeopardy. Cruise lines have sold, renovated, or renamed their ships to keep up with travel trends. Cruise lines operate their ships almost constantly. If the maintenance is unscheduled, it can result, potentially, in thousands of dissatisfied customers.

A wave of failures and consolidations in the 1990s led to many cruise lines being bought by much larger holding companies and continue to operate as "brands" or subsidiaries of the holding company. Brands continue to be maintained partly because of the expectation of repeat customer loyalty, and also to offer different levels of quality and service. For instance, Carnival Corporation & plc owns both Carnival Cruise Line, whose former image were vessels that had a reputation as "party ships" for younger travelers, but have become large, modern, yet still profitable, as well as Holland America Line and Cunard Line, whose ships cultivate an image of classic elegance. In 2004, Carnival had merged Cunard's headquarters with that of Princess Cruises in Santa Clarita, California so that administrative, financial and technology services could be combined, ending Cunard's history where it had operated as a standalone company (subsidiary) regardless of parent ownership. However, Cunard did regain some independence in 2009 when its headquarters were moved to Carnival House in Southampton.

The common practice in the cruise industry in listing cruise ship transfers and orders is to list the smaller operating company, not the larger holding corporation, as the recipient cruise line of the sale, transfer, or new order. In other words, Carnival Cruise Line and Holland America Line, for example, are the cruise lines from this common industry practice point of view; whereas Carnival Corporation & plc and Royal Caribbean Group, for example, can be considered holding corporations of cruise lines. This industry practice of using the smaller operating company, not the larger holding corporation, is also followed in the list of cruise lines and in member-based reviews of cruise lines.

Some cruise lines have specialties; for example, Saga Cruises only allows passengers over 50 years old aboard their ships, and Star Clippers and formerly Windjammer Barefoot Cruises and Windstar Cruises only operate tall ships. Regent Seven Seas Cruises operates medium-sized vessels—smaller than the "megaships" of Carnival and Royal Caribbean—designed such that virtually all of their suites are balconies. Several specialty lines offer "expedition cruising" or only operate small ships, visiting certain destinations such as the Arctic and Antarctica, or the Galápagos Islands. , which formerly operated as part of the United States Merchant Marine during World War II before being converted to a museum ship, still gets underway several times a year for six-hour "Living History Cruises" that take the ship through Baltimore Harbor, down the Patapsco River, and into the Chesapeake Bay, and she is also the largest cruise ship operating under the American flag on the United States East Coast.

Currently the three largest cruise line holding companies and operators in the world are Carnival Corporation & plc, Royal Caribbean Group and Norwegian Cruise Line Holdings.

As an industry, the total number of cabins on all of the world's cruise ships amount to less than 2% of the world's hotel rooms.

Organization

Cruise ships are organized much like floating hotels, with a complete hospitality staff in addition to the usual ship's crew. It is not uncommon for the most luxurious ships to have more crew and staff than passengers.

Dining

Dining on almost all cruise ships is included in the cruise price. Traditionally, the ships' restaurants organize two dinner services per day, early dining and late dining, and passengers are allocated a set dining time for the entire cruise; a recent trend is to allow diners to dine whenever they want. Having two dinner times allows the ship to have enough time and space to accommodate all of their guests. Having two different dinner services can cause some conflicts with some of the ship's events (such as shows and performances) for the late diners, but this problem is usually fixed by having a shorter version of the event take place before late dinner. Cunard Line ships maintain the class tradition of ocean liners and have separate dining rooms for different types of suites, while Celebrity Cruises and Princess Cruises have a standard dining room and "upgrade" specialty restaurants that require pre-booking and cover charges. Many cruises schedule one or more "formal dining" nights. Guests dress "formally", however that is defined for the ship, often suits and ties or even tuxedos for men, and formal dresses for women. The menu is more upscale than usual.

Besides the dining room, modern cruise ships often contain one or more casual buffet-style eateries, which may be open 24 hours and with menus that vary throughout the day to provide meals ranging from breakfast to late-night snacks. In recent years, cruise lines have started to include a diverse range of ethnically themed restaurants aboard each ship. Ships also feature numerous bars and nightclubs for passenger entertainment; the majority of cruise lines do not include alcoholic beverages in their fares and passengers are expected to pay for drinks as they consume them. Most cruise lines also prohibit passengers from bringing aboard and consuming their own beverages, including alcohol, while aboard. Alcohol purchased duty-free is sealed and returned to passengers when they disembark.

There is often a central galley responsible for serving all major restaurants aboard the ship, though specialty restaurants may have their own separate galleys.

As with any vessel, adequate provisioning is crucial, especially on a cruise ship serving several thousand meals at each seating.

Other on-board facilities

Modern cruise ships typically have aboard some or all of the following facilities:
 Buffet restaurant
 Card room
 Casino — Only open when the ship is at sea to avoid conflict with local laws
 Child care facilities
 Cinema
 Clubs
 Fitness center
 Hot tub
 Indoor and/or outdoor swimming pool with water slides
 Infirmary and morgue
 Karaoke
 Library
 Lounges
 Observation lounge
 Ping pong tables
 Pool tables
 Shops — Only open when the ship is at sea to avoid merchandising licensing and local taxes
 Spa
 Teen Lounges
 Theatre with Broadway-style shows

Some ships have bowling alleys, ice skating rinks, rock climbing walls, sky-diving simulators, miniature golf courses, video arcades, ziplines, surfing simulators, water slides, basketball courts, tennis courts, chain restaurants, ropes obstacle courses, and even roller coasters.

Crew
Crew are usually hired on three to eleven month contracts which may then be renewed as mutually agreed, depending on service ratings from passengers as well as the cyclical nature of the cruise line operator. Most staff work 77-hour work weeks for 10 months continuously followed by two months of vacation.

There are no paid vacations or pensions for service, non-management crew, depending on the level of the position and the type of the contract. Non-service and management crew members get paid vacation, medical, retirement options, and can participate in the company's group insurance plan.

The direct salary is low by North American standards, though restaurant staff have considerable earning potential from passenger tips. Crew members do not have any expenses while on board, because food and accommodation, medical care, and transportation for most employees, are included. Oyogoa states that "Crewing agencies often exploit the desperation of potential employees."

Living arrangements vary by cruise line, but mostly by shipboard position. In general two employees share a cabin with a shower, commode and a desk with a television set, while senior officers are assigned single cabins. There is a set of facilities for the crew separate from that for passengers, such as mess rooms and bars, recreation rooms, prayer rooms/mosques, and fitness center, with some larger ships even having a crew deck with a swimming pool and hot tubs.

All crew members are required to bring their certificates for the Standard of training, certification and watchkeeping or completing the training while being on board. Crew members need to consider completing this certification prior to embarking since it is time-consuming and needs to be accomplished at the same time they perform their daily work activities while being on board.

For the largest cruise operators, most "hotel staff" are hired from less industrialized countries in Asia, Eastern Europe, the Caribbean, and Central America. While several cruise lines are headquartered in the United States, like most international shipping companies, ships are registered in countries such as the Netherlands, the UK, the Bahamas, and Panama. The International Labour Organization's 2006 Maritime Labour Convention, also known as the "Seafarers' Bill of Rights," provides comprehensive rights and protections for all crew members. The ILO sets rigorous standards regarding hours of work and rest, health and safety, and living conditions for crew members, and requires governments to ensure that ships carrying their flags comply. For cruise routes around Hawaii, operators are required to register their ships in the United States and the crew is unionized, so these cruises are typically much more expensive than in the Caribbean or the Mediterranean.

Business model
Most cruise lines since the 2000s have to some extent priced the cruising experience à la carte, as passenger spending aboard generates significantly more than ticket sales. The passenger's ticket includes the stateroom accommodation, room service, unlimited meals in the main dining room (or main restaurant) and buffet, access to shows, and use of pool and gym facilities, while there is a daily gratuity charge to cover housekeeping and waiter service. However, there are extra charges for alcohol and soft drinks, official cruise photos, Internet and wi-fi access, and specialty restaurants. Cruise lines earn significantly from selling onshore excursions offered by local contractors; keeping 50% or more of what passengers spend for these tours. In addition, cruise ships earn significant commissions on sales from onshore stores that are promoted on board as "preferred" (as much as 40% of gross sales). Facilitating this practice are modern cruise terminals with establishments of duty-free shops inside a perimeter accessible only by passengers and not by locals. Ports of call have often oriented their own businesses and facilities towards meeting the needs of visiting cruise ships. In one case, Icy Strait Point in Alaska, the entire destination was created explicitly and solely for cruise ship visitors.

Travel to and from the port of departure is usually the passengers' responsibility, although purchasing a transfer pass from the cruise line for the trip between the airport and cruise terminal will guarantee that the ship will not leave until the passenger is aboard. Similarly, if the passenger books a shore excursion with the cruise line and the tour runs late, the ship is obliged to remain until the passenger returns.

Luxury cruise lines such as Regent Seven Seas Cruises and Crystal Cruises market their fares as "all-inclusive". For example, the base fare on Regent Seven Seas ships includes most alcoholic beverages on board ship and most shore excursions in ports of call, as well as all gratuities that would normally be paid to hotel staff on the ship. The fare may also include a one-night hotel stay before boarding, and the air fare to and from the cruise's origin and destination ports.

Many cruise lines have loyalty programs. Using these and by booking inexpensive tickets, some people have found it cheaper to live continuously on cruise ships instead of on land.

Cruise ship utilization
Cruise ships and former liners often find use in applications other than those for which they were built. Due to slower speed and reduced seaworthiness, as well as being largely introduced after several major wars, cruise ships have also been used as troop transport vessels. By contrast, ocean liners were often seen as the pride of their country and used to rival liners of other nations, and have been requisitioned during both World Wars and the Falklands War to transport soldiers and serve as hospital ships.

During the 1992 Summer Olympics, eleven cruise ships docked at the Port of Barcelona for an average of 18 days, served as floating hotels to help accommodate the large influx of visitors to the Games. They were available to sponsors and hosted 11,000 guests a day, making it the second largest concentration of Olympic accommodation behind the Olympic Village. This hosting solution has been used since then in Games held in coastal cities, such as at Sydney 2000, Athens 2004, London 2012, Sochi 2014, Rio 2016 and was going to be used at Tokyo 2020.

Cruise ships have been used to accommodate displaced persons during hurricanes. For example, on 1 September 2005, the U.S. Federal Emergency Management Agency (FEMA) contracted three Carnival Cruise Lines vessels (the former , and the ) to house Hurricane Katrina evacuees. In 2017, cruise ships were used to help transport residents from some Caribbean islands destroyed by Hurricane Irma, as well as Puerto Rico residents displaced by Hurricane Maria.

The cruise ships have also been used for evacuations. In 2010, in response to the shutdown of UK airspace due to the eruption of Iceland's Eyjafjallajökull volcano, the newly completed  was used to rescue 2,000 British tourists stranded in Spain as an act of goodwill by the owners. The ship departed from Southampton for Bilbao on 21 April, and returned on 23 April. A cruise ship was kept on standby in case inhabitants of Kangaroo Island required evacuation in 2020 after a series of fires burned on the island.

Regional industries

Most cruise ships sail the Caribbean or the Mediterranean. Others operate elsewhere in places like Alaska, the South Pacific, the Baltic Sea and New England. A cruise ship that is moving from one of these regions to another will commonly operate a repositioning cruise while doing so. Expedition cruise lines, which usually operate small ships, visit certain more specialized destinations such as the Arctic and Antarctica, or the Galápagos Islands.

The number of cruise tourists worldwide in 2005 was estimated at some 14 million. The main region for cruising was North America (70% of cruises), where the Caribbean islands were the most popular destinations.

The second most popular region was continental Europe (13%), where the fastest growing segment is cruises in the Baltic Sea. The most visited Baltic ports are Copenhagen, St. Petersburg, Tallinn, Stockholm and Helsinki.
The seaport of St. Petersburg, the main Baltic port of call, received 426,500 passengers during the 2009 cruise season.

According to 2010 CEMAR statistics the Mediterranean cruise market is going through a fast and fundamental change; Italy has won prime position as a destination for European cruises, and destination for the whole of the Mediterranean basin. The most visited ports in Mediterranean Sea are Barcelona (Spain), Civitavecchia (Italy), Palma (Spain) and Venice (Italy).

2013 saw the entrance of the first Chinese company into the cruise market. China's first luxury cruise ship, Henna, made her maiden voyage from Sanya Phoenix Island International Port in late January.

Caribbean cruising industry

The Caribbean cruising industry is one of the largest in the world, responsible for over $2 billion in direct revenue to the Caribbean islands in 2012. Over 45,000 people from the Caribbean are directly employed in the cruise industry. An estimated 17,457,600 cruise passengers visited the islands in the 2011–2012 cruise year (May 2011 to April 2012.) Cruise lines operating in the Caribbean include Royal Caribbean International, Princess Cruises, Carnival Cruise Line, Celebrity Cruises, Disney Cruise Line, Holland America, P&O, Cunard and Norwegian Cruise Line. There are also smaller cruise lines that cater to a more intimate feeling among their guests. The three largest cruise operators are Carnival Corporation, Royal Caribbean International, and Star Cruises/Norwegian Cruise Lines.

Many American cruise lines to the Caribbean depart out of the Port of Miami, with "nearly one-third of the cruises sailing out of Miami in recent years". Some UK cruise lines base their ships out of Barbados for the Caribbean season, operating direct charter flights out of the UK.

The busiest ports of call in the Caribbean for cruising in the 2014 year are listed below:

Alaskan cruising industry 
2016 was the most recent year of CLIA (Cruise Lines International Association) studies conducted around the cruise industry specifically in the US and more specifically Alaska. In 2016, Alaskan cruises generated nearly 5 million passenger and crew visits, 20.3% of all passenger and crew visits in the US. (NASDAQ, 2017) Cruise lines frequently bring passengers to Glacier Bay National Park, Ketchikan, Anchorage, Skagway, and the state's capital, Juneau.

Visitor volume is represented by overall visitors entering Alaskan waters and/or airspace. Between October 2016 and September 2017 Alaska had about 2.2 million visitors; 49% of those were through the cruise industry. That 2.2 million was a 27% increase since 2009, and the volume overall has steadily increased. Visitors generally spend money when travelling, and this is measured in two distinct areas: the cruising companies themselves and the visitors. There are no current numbers for cruise specific passenger spending ashore, but the overall visitor expenditure can be measured. Tours accounted for $394 million (18%), gifts and souvenirs $427 million (20%), food $428 million (20%), transportation $258 million (12%), lodging $454 million (21%), and other $217 million (10%). The second main area of economic growth comes from what the cruising companies and their crews spend themselves. Cruise liners spend around $297 million on the items that come in their packages on board and ashore as parts of group tours: things like stagecoach rides and boat tours on smaller vessels throughout their ports of call. This money is paid to the service providers by the cruise line company. Cruise liner crew are also a revenue generator, with 27,000 crew members visiting Alaska in 2017 alone, generating about $22 million. 2017 was also a good year for job generation within Alaska: 43,300 jobs were created, bringing in $1.5 billion in labor costs, and a total income of $4.5 billion was generated. These jobs were scattered across all of Alaska. Southeast Alaska had 11,925 jobs ($455 million labor income), Southwest 1,800 jobs ($50 million labor income), South Central 20,700 jobs ($761 million Labor income), Interior 8,500 jobs ($276 million labor income), Far North 375 jobs ($13 M labor income). Labor income is shown in the graph below.

Shipyards
The construction market for cruise ships is dominated by three European companies and one Asian company:
 Chantiers de l’Atlantique of France.
 Fincantieri of Italy with:
 Ancona shipyards (located at Ancona)
  Marghera shipyards (located at Marghera, Venice)
 Monfalcone shipyards (located at Monfalcone, Gorizia)
 Sestri Ponente shipyards (located at Genoa)
 VARD Braila shipyards (located at Braila)
 VARD Søviknes Shipyard (located in Norway)
 VARD Tulcea shipyards (located at Tulcea)
 Meyer Werft of Germany with two shipyards:
 Meyer Turku at Perno shipyard in Turku, Finland
 Meyer Werft of Germany.
 Mitsubishi Heavy Industries of Japan.
A large number of cruise ships have been built by other shipyards, but no other individual yard has reached the large numbers of built ships achieved by the four above.

Safety and security

Piracy

As a result, cruise ships have implemented various security measures. While most merchant shipping firms have generally avoided arming crew or security guards for reasons of safety, liability and conformity with the laws of the countries where they dock, cruise ships have small arms (usually semi-automatic pistols) stored in a safe accessible only by the captain who distributes them to authorized personnel such as security or the master-at-arms. The ship's high-pressure fire hoses can be used to keep boarders at bay, and often the vessel itself can be maneuvered to ram pirate craft. A recent technology to deter pirates has been the LRAD or sonic cannon which was used in the successful defence of Seabourn Spirit.

A related risk is that of terrorism, the most notable incident being that of the 1985 hijacking of Achille Lauro, an Italian cruise ship.

Crime on-board
Passengers entering the cruise ship are screened by metal detectors. Explosive detection machines used include X-ray machines and explosives trace-detection portal machines (a.k.a. "puffer machines"), to prevent weapons, drugs and other contraband on board. Security has been considerably tightened since 11 September 2001, such that these measures are similar to airport security.

In addition to security checkpoints, passengers are often given a ship-specific identification card, which must be shown in order to get on or off the ship. This prevents people boarding who are not entitled to do so, and also ensures the ship's crew are aware of who is on the ship. The Cruise Ship ID cards are also used as the passenger's room key. CCTV cameras are mounted frequently throughout the ship.

In 2010, the United States Congress passed the Cruise Vessel Security and Safety Act after numerous incidents of sexual violence, passenger disappearances, physical assault, and other serious crimes. Congress said:

Passengers on cruise vessels have an inadequate appreciation of their potential vulnerability to crime while on ocean voyages, and those who may be victimized lack the information they need to understand their legal rights or to know whom to contact for help in the immediate aftermath of the crime.

Congress said both passengers and crew committed crimes. It said data on the problem was lacking because cruise lines did not make it publicly available, multiple countries were involved in investigating incidents on international waters, and crime scenes could not be secured quickly by police. It recommended that owners of cruise vessels:
 install acoustic hailing and warning devices capable of working at a distance.
 install more security cameras
 install peep holes in passenger room doors
 limit access to passenger rooms to select staff at specific times

After investigating the death of Dianne Brimble in 2002, a coroner in Australia recommended:
 Federal police officers travel on ships to ensure a quick response to crime,
 scanners and drug detection dogs check passengers and crew at Australian ports,
 an end to overlaps between jurisdictions, and
 flags of ships be disregarded for nations unable to investigate incidents thoroughly and competently.

The lobby group International Cruise Victims Association, based in Arizona, pushes for more regulation of the cruise industry, and supports victims of crimes committed on cruise ships.

Overboard drownings
Passengers and crew sometimes drown after going overboard in what the industry calls man-overboard incidents (MOBs). Since 2000, more than 300 people have fallen off cruise ships or large ferries, which is an average of about 1.5 people each month. Of those, only about 17 to 25 percent were rescued. Critics of the industry blame alcohol promotion for many passenger deaths, and poor labour conditions for crew suicides. They also point to underinvestment in the latest MOB sensors, a lack of regulation and consumer protection, and a lack of on-board counselling services for crew. The industry blames irresponsible behaviour by passengers, and says overboard sensors are unreliable and generate false alarms.

Maritime lawyer Jim Walker estimates about half of all disappearances at sea involve some factor of foul play, and that a lack of police jurisdiction on international waters allows sexual predators to go unpunished.

Stability

Modern cruise ships are tall but remain stable due to their relatively low center of mass. This is due to large open spaces and the extensive use of aluminium, high-strength steel and other lightweight materials in the upper parts, and the fact that the heaviest components — engines, propellers, fuel tanks and such — are located at the bottom of the hull. Thus, even though modern cruise ships may appear tall, proper weight distribution ensures that they are not top-heavy. Furthermore, large cruise ships tend to be very wide, which considerably increases their initial stability by increasing the metacentric height.

Although most passenger ships utilize stabilizers to reduce rolling in heavy weather, they are only used for crew and passenger comfort and do not contribute to the overall intact stability of the vessel. The ships must fulfill all stability requirements even with the stabilizer fins retracted.

According to the Washington Post, a recent study by economic consultant G.P. Wild – commissioned by the cruise industry's trade group and released in March 2019 – argued that cruises are getting safer over time. The study claims that, even as capacity increased 55 percent between 2009 and 2018, the number of overall "operational incidents" declined 37 percent and the rate of man-overboard cases dropped 35 percent.

Disease

Norovirus
Norovirus is a virus that commonly causes gastroenteritis in developed countries, and is also a cause of gastroenteritis on cruise ships. It is typically transmitted from person to person. Symptoms usually last between 1 and 3 days and generally resolve without treatment or long term consequences. The incubation period of the virus averages about 24 hours.

Norovirus outbreaks are often perceived to be associated with cruise ships. According to the United States CDC, the factors that cause norovirus to be associated with cruise ships include the closer tracking and faster reporting of illnesses on cruise ships compared to those on land; the closer living quarters that increases the amount of interpersonal contact; as well as the turnover of passengers that may bring the viruses on board.

However, the estimated likelihood of contracting gastroenteritis from any cause on an average 7-day cruise is less than 1%. In 2009, during which more than 13 million people took a cruise, there were nine reported norovirus outbreaks on cruise ships. Outbreak investigations by the United States Centers for Disease Control and Prevention (CDC) have shown that transmission among cruise ship passengers is primarily person-to-person; potable water supplies have not been implicated. In a study published in the Journal of the American Medical Association, the CDC reported that, "Perceptions that cruise ships can be luxury breeding grounds for acute gastroenteritis outbreaks don't hold water. A recent CDC report showed that from 2008 to 2014, only 0.18% of more than 73 million cruise passengers and 0.15% of some 28 million crew members reported symptoms of the illness."

Ships docked in port undergo surprise health inspections. In 2009, ships that underwent unannounced inspections by the CDC received an average CDC Vessel Sanitation Program score of approximately 97 out of a total possible 100 points. The minimum passing inspection score is 85. Collaboration with the CDC's Vessel Sanitation Program and the development of Outbreak Prevention and Response Plans has been credited in decreasing the incidence of norovirus outbreaks on ships.

Legionnaires' disease
Other pathogens which can colonise pools and spas including those on cruise ships include Legionella, the bacterium which causes Legionnaires' disease. Legionella, and in particular the most virulent strain, Legionella pneumophila serogroup 1, can cause infections when inhaled as an aerosol or aspirated. Individuals who are immunocompromised and those with pre-existing chronic respiratory and cardiac disease are more susceptible. Legionnaires' has been infrequently associated with cruise ships.

Enterotoxigenic Escherichia coli (ETEC)
Enterotoxigenic Escherichia coli is a form of E. coli and the leading bacterial cause of diarrhea in the developing world, as well as the most common cause of diarrhea for travelers to those areas. Since 2008 there has been at least one reported incident each year of E. coli on international cruise ships reported to the Vessel Sanitation Program of the Centers for Disease Control, though there were none in 2015. Causes of E. coli infection include the consumption of contaminated food or water contaminated by human waste.

COVID-19 

News outlets reported several cases and suspected cases of Coronavirus disease 2019 associated with cruise ships in early 2020. Authorities variously turned away ships or quarantined them; cruise operators cancelled some port visits and ultimately suspended global cruise operations. People aboard cruise ships played a role in spreading the disease in some countries.

Environmental impact

Cruise ships generate a number of waste streams that can result in discharges to the marine environment, including sewage, graywater, hazardous wastes, oily bilge water, ballast water, and solid waste. They also emit air pollutants to the air and water. These wastes, if not properly treated and disposed of, can be a significant source of pathogens, nutrients, and toxic substances with the potential to threaten human health and damage aquatic life.

Most cruise ships run (primarily) on heavy fuel oil (HFO), or "bunker fuel", which, because of its high sulphur content, results in sulphur dioxide emissions worse than those of equivalent road traffic. The international MARPOL IV-14 agreement for Sulphur Emission Control Areas requires that cruise ships must use fuel containing no more than 0.10% sulphur or make use of exhaust gas scrubbers to reduce sulfur oxide emissions to no worse than an engine running on <0.1% sulfur fuel. Cruise ships may use 60 percent of the fuel energy for propulsion, and 40 percent for hotel functions, but loads and distribution depend highly on conditions.

It has been claimed that air pollution from maritime transport, including cruise ships, is responsible for 50 000 deaths per year in Europe.

Some cruise lines, such as Cunard, are taking steps to reduce environmental impact by refraining from discharges (Queen Mary 2 has a zero-discharge policy) and reducing their carbon dioxide output every year.

Cruise ships require electrical power, normally provided by diesel generators, although an increasing number of new ships are fueled by liquified natural gas (LNG). When docked, ships must run their generators continuously to power on-board facilities, unless they are capable of using onshore power, where available. Some cruise ships already support the use of shorepower, while others are being adapted to do so.

Sunken vessels 

  accidentally sunk on 4 August 1991 after suffering uncontrolled flooding, no fatalities.
  caught fire and sank 30 November 1994, two dead.
  accidentally hit a reef and capsized on 6 April 2007, two dead.
  accidentally sunk on 23 November 2007 after hitting an iceberg, no fatalities.
  sank accidentally on 13 January 2012 after hitting some rocks, 32 dead.
 Hableány, a river cruise ship, sank on 29 May 2019 after accidentally colliding with the river cruise ship Viking Sigyn, 27 dead.

See also

 Cruiseferry
 Lido
 List of cruise ships
 List of largest cruise ships
 List of ocean liners
 River cruise

References

Bibliography

 Ward, Douglas, Berlitz Ocean Cruising and Cruise Ships, published annually

Further reading

External links

 

 
Ship types